Appunidage Premachandra (born 18 May 1953) is a Sri Lankan sprinter. He competed in the men's 4 × 400 metres relay at the 1980 Summer Olympics.

References

External links
 

1953 births
Living people
Athletes (track and field) at the 1980 Summer Olympics
Sri Lankan male sprinters
Olympic athletes of Sri Lanka
Athletes (track and field) at the 1978 Commonwealth Games
Commonwealth Games competitors for Sri Lanka
Place of birth missing (living people)
Asian Games gold medalists for Sri Lanka
Asian Games medalists in athletics (track and field)
Athletes (track and field) at the 1974 Asian Games
Medalists at the 1974 Asian Games